Saimon Sutt (born 12 April 1995) is an Estonian professional basketball player who plays for Pärnu Sadam of the Latvian-Estonian Basketball League. Standing at 2.00 m (6 ft 7 in), he plays at the shooting guard position.

Professional career
Sutt began playing basketball with the youth teams of Salva Tartu, before moving to University of Tartu. He made his debut in the Korvpalli Meistriliiga (KML) in the 2012–13 season. In 2015, Sutt won his first KML championship.

On 20 July 2016, Sutt signed with BC Pärnu.

In September 2022, Sutt signed with KR of the Úrvalsdeild karla. He was released by the club in end of November after appearing in four games.

In January 2023 he rejoined BC Pärnu.

National team career
Sutt made his debut for the Estonian national team on 13 September 2018, in a 2019 FIBA Basketball World Cup European qualifier against Germany.

Awards and accomplishments

Professional career
University of Tartu
 Estonian League champion: 2015
 2× Estonian Cup champion: 2013, 2014

References

External links
Saimon Sutt at basket.ee
Saimon Sutt at fiba.com
Profile at Proballers.com

1995 births
Living people
Estonian expatriate basketball people in Iceland
Estonian men's basketball players
KK Pärnu players
Korvpalli Meistriliiga players
KR men's basketball players
Shooting guards
Sportspeople from Tartu
Tartu Ülikool/Rock players
Úrvalsdeild karla (basketball) players